Deborah Yaffe (born 1965) is the author of two books, most recently and prominently the book Among the Janeites: A Journey through the World of Jane Austen Fandom  (Houghton Mifflin Mariner, 2013). The book describes Yaffe's lifelong love of Jane Austen, as well as the lives and ideas of many other Jane Austen fans or "Janeites." Yaffe's book has been featured in The New York Times, the New York Post, The Christian Science Monitor, and O! Magazine, among others. Yaffe has been a reporter in New York and California and is also the author of Other People's Children: The Battle for Justice and Equality in New Jersey Schools.

References

External links
http://www.deborahyaffe.com

Jane Austen
1965 births
Living people
20th-century American women writers
21st-century American women writers